Jaipur-Kishangarh Expressway is a  long access controlled toll expressway connecting Jaipur, the capital of the Indian state of Rajasthan to Kishangarh. The expressway forms a segment of the NH-8 which is a part of the Golden Quadrilateral project, which itself is a part of the National Highway Development Project (NHDP). The six-lane expressway was inaugurated in April 2005. Construction work was handled by GVK Jaipur Expressway Private Limited (GJEPL) under the build-operate-transfer model. Built at a cost of 7.29 billion INR, the expressway was the first Indian road built under the public-private partnership model.

References

Transport in Jaipur
Transport in Ajmer
Expressways in Rajasthan
Roads in Rajasthan
Kishangarh